Anson Peaslee Morrill (June 10, 1803 – July 4, 1887) was an American politician who served as the 24th governor of Maine from 1855 to 1856 and later as the U.S. representative from Maine's 4th congressional district from 1861 to 1863.

Biography
Morrill was born in 1803 in Belgrade (in modern-day Maine, then a part of Massachusetts). In his early years, Morrill served as the Postmaster of Dearborn and ran a general store. He was elected to the Maine House of Representatives in 1833 from Belgrade. He served as Cumberland County Sheriff in 1839, and was subsequently elected the State House from Madison in 1844. In 1850, Morrill was appointed State Land Agent, and served until 1854.

Though Morrill was a Democrat, he emerged as the anti-Maine Law candidate for Governor in 1853. In that year's gubernatorial election, Morrill placed third, winning 13% of the vote to Democrat Albert Pillsbury's 44% and incumbent Whig Governor William Crosby’s 32%. No candidate received a majority of the vote, which threw the election to the state legislature. Though the governing coalition of Whigs, Free Soilers, and anti-Maine Law Democrats originally agreed to elect Morrill as Governor, the Whigs backed out—and instead re-elected Crosby as Governor.

Morrill again in 1854, this time as the Know Nothing nominee, and won 49% of the vote to Albion Parris's 31% and Isaac Reed's 15%. The election was once again thrown to the legislature, which elected Morrill. He ran for re-election in 1855 as the nominee of the newly formed Republican Party, but though he won 47% of the vote to Democrat Samuel Wells's 44%, the legislature elected Wells over Morrill.

In 1860, Morrill was elected to the United States House of Representatives from Maine's 4th congressional district. Though James G. Blaine had originally planned on running for the seat, he deferred to Morrill. In 1862, Morrill opted against seeking re-election to allow Blaine to run. After leaving Congress, he served as President of the Maine Central Railroad. He served one final term as a member of the Maine House from 1881 to 1882. In 1882, Morrill urged Blaine, his old friend, to run for Congress, but Blaine declined.

Governor Morrill died in 1887 in Augusta, Maine and is buried at the Forest Grove Cemetery in Augusta.

References

Citations

Sources

External links

1803 births
1887 deaths
19th-century American railroad executives
Republican Party governors of Maine
Maine sheriffs
Republican Party members of the Maine House of Representatives
People of Maine in the American Civil War
People from Belgrade, Maine
Republican Party members of the United States House of Representatives from Maine
19th-century American politicians